Marksa is a village in Audru Parish, Pärnu County, in southwestern Estonia, on the coast of Pärnu Bay (part of the Gulf of Riga). It has a population of 93 (as of 1 January 2011).

Lindi Nature Reserve with Lindi bog is located just northwest of Marksa, in Kõpu.

References

Villages in Pärnu County